Orrin Ogumoro Pharmin (born 8 December 1986) is a Northern Mariana Islander sprinter. He competed in the 100 metres event at the 2011 World Championships in Athletics.

References

1986 births
Living people
Northern Mariana Islands male sprinters
Place of birth missing (living people)